The economy of Saint Pierre and Miquelon, due to the islands' location, has been dependent on fishing and servicing fishing fleets operating off the coast of Newfoundland. The economy has been declining, however, due to disputes with Canada over fishing quotas and a decline in the number of ships stopping at the islands. The islands are heavily subsidized by France, which benefits the standard of living. The government hopes an expansion of tourism will boost economic prospects, and test drilling for oil may pave the way development of the energy sector.

See also 
Economy of France
List of French regions and overseas collectivities by GDP

References